KELT-1 is a F-type main-sequence star. Its surface temperature is 6518 K. It is similar to the Sun in its concentration of heavy elements, with a metallicity Fe/H index of 0.008, but is much younger at an age of 1.75 billion years. The star is rotating very rapidly.

A red dwarf stellar companion at a projected separation of 154 AU was detected in 2012, simultaneously with a planetary companion.

Planetary system
The star was found to be orbited by a low-mass brown dwarf or giant planet in 2012. 

Brown dwarf/planet KELT-1b has an equilibrium temperature of 2422 K, but features a very strong contrast between measured dayside and nightside temperatures. Dayside temperature appears to be 3340 K, while nightside temperature is 1173 K. The excess dayside temperature may be an artifact arising from highly reflective (dayside albedo reaching 0.5, which is unusual for hot planets and brown dwarfs) rock-vapor clouds. Also, the brightest band is shifted eastward from the subsolar point by 18.3°.

KELT-1b's  density of 22.1 g/cm3 is the highest among well characterized planets.

The planetary orbit is well aligned with the equatorial plane of the star, with the misalignment angle equal to 2°. Despite the short orbital period, orbital decay of KELT-1b has not been detected as of 2018.

See also
List of exoplanet extremes

References

Andromeda (constellation)
Binary stars

Planetary systems with one confirmed planet
Planetary transit variables
F-type main-sequence stars
J00012691+3923017
Brown dwarfs
TIC objects